"Elvis (...I Remember)" is a song by Australian rock band The Screaming Jets. The song was released in June 1997 as the lead single from the band's fourth studio World Gone Crazy (1997). The song peaked at number 71 on the ARIA Charts.

Track listing
 "Elvis (...I Remember)" – 3:54
 "Sense" – 3:21
 "Silence Lost" – 4:20
 "Fortunate Son" – 2:31

Charts

Release history

References

1997 songs
1997 singles
Songs about Elvis Presley
The Screaming Jets songs